Thomas Robert Moore (born 1938)  was Dean of Clogher  from 1995  until 2004. he was educated at Trinity College, Dublin, and ordained in 1969. After  curacies in Dublin and Portadown he held  incumbencies at Kilskeery  and Trory until his time as Dean.

References

Irish Anglicans
1938 births
Alumni of Trinity College Dublin
Deans of Clogher
Living people